The Gabala FC 2008–09 season was Gabala's third Azerbaijan Premier League season, and their third season under manager Ramiz Mammadov. They finished 10th in the Premier League, whilst being knocked out at the Semifinal stage of the 2008–09 Azerbaijan Cup by Inter Baku. Their kit was supplied by Erreà and their main sponsor was Hyundai.

Squad

Transfers

Summer

In:

<

Out:

Winter

In:

 

Out:

Competitions

Azerbaijan Premier League

Results summary

Results by round

Results

Table

Azerbaijan Cup

Squad statistics

Appearances and goals

|-
|colspan="14"|Players who appeared for Gabala no longer at the club:

|}

Goal scorers

Notes
On 31 October 2008, FK NBC Salyan changed their name to FK Mughan.
Qarabağ have played their home games at the Tofiq Bahramov Stadium since 1993 due to the ongoing situation in Quzanlı.

References

Gabala FC seasons
Gabala